The following outline is provided as an overview of and topical guide to Kiribati:

Kiribati – sovereign island nation located in the central equatorial Pacific Ocean.

General reference 

 Pronunciation: /kiː.ɹɨˈbæs/
 Common English country name:  Kiribati
 Official English country name:  The Republic of Kiribati
 Common endonym(s):  
 Official endonym(s):  
 Adjectival(s): I-Kiribati
 Demonym(s): I-Kiribati
 Etymology: Name of Kiribati
 ISO country codes:  KI, KIR, 296
 ISO region codes:  See ISO 3166-2:KI
 Internet country code top-level domain:  .ki

Geography of Kiribati 

Geography of Kiribati
 Kiribati is: an island country
 Location:
 Southern Hemisphere and Eastern Hemisphere
 Pacific Ocean
 South Pacific
 Oceania
 Micronesia
 Time zones:
 Line Islands – UTC+14
 Phoenix Islands – UTC+13
 Gilbert Islands – UTC+12
 Extreme points of Kiribati
 High:  unnamed location on Banaba 
 Low:  Pacific Ocean 0 m
 Land boundaries:  none
 Coastline:  Pacific Ocean 1,143 km
 Population of Kiribati: 110,000 (2015) - 188th most populous country

 Area of Kiribati: 726 km2
 Atlas of Kiribati

Environment of Kiribati 

 Climate of Kiribati
 Renewable energy in Kiribati
 Geology of Kiribati
 Protected areas of Kiribati
 Biosphere reserves in Kiribati
 National parks of Kiribati
 Wildlife of Kiribati
 Fauna of Kiribati
 Birds of Kiribati
 Mammals of Kiribati

Natural geographic features of Kiribati 
 Islands of Kiribati
 Lakes of Kiribati
 Rivers of Kiribati
 Waterfalls of Kiribati
 World Heritage Sites in Kiribati: Phoenix Islands Protected Area

Regions of Kiribati 

Regions of Kiribati

Ecoregions of Kiribati 

List of ecoregions in Kiribati
 Ecoregions in Kiribati

Administrative divisions of Kiribati 
None

Municipalities of Kiribati 
 Capital of Kiribati: South Tarawa
 Cities of Kiribati

Demography of Kiribati 

Demographics of Kiribati

Government and politics of Kiribati 

Politics of Kiribati
 Form of government: unitary parliamentary representative democratic republic
 Capital of Kiribati: South Tarawa
 Elections in Kiribati
 Political parties in Kiribati

Branches of the government of Kiribati 

Government of Kiribati

Executive branch of the government of Kiribati 
 Head of state and head of government: Taneti Maamau, Beretitenti
 Cabinet of Kiribati

Legislative branch of the government of Kiribati 
 Parliament of Kiribati: House of Assembly (unicameral)

Judicial branch of the government of Kiribati 

Court system of Kiribati
 High Court of Kiribati
 Court of Appeal of Kiribati (higher court)

Foreign relations of Kiribati 

Foreign relations of Kiribati
 Diplomatic missions in Kiribati
 Diplomatic missions of Kiribati

International organization membership 
The Republic of Kiribati is a member of:

African, Caribbean, and Pacific Group of States (ACP)
Asian Development Bank (ADB)
Commonwealth of Nations
Food and Agriculture Organization (FAO)
International Bank for Reconstruction and Development (IBRD)
International Civil Aviation Organization (ICAO)
International Development Association (IDA)
International Federation of Red Cross and Red Crescent Societies (IFRCS)
International Finance Corporation (IFC)
International Fund for Agricultural Development (IFAD)
International Labour Organization (ILO)
International Maritime Organization (IMO)
International Monetary Fund (IMF)
International Olympic Committee (IOC)

International Red Cross and Red Crescent Movement (ICRM)
International Telecommunication Union (ITU)
International Trade Union Confederation (ITUC)
Organisation for the Prohibition of Chemical Weapons (OPCW)
 The Pacific Community (SPC)
Pacific Islands Forum (PIF)
South Pacific Regional Trade and Economic Cooperation Agreement (Sparteca)
United Nations (UN)
United Nations Conference on Trade and Development (UNCTAD)
United Nations Educational, Scientific, and Cultural Organization (UNESCO)
Universal Postal Union (UPU)
World Health Organization (WHO)
World Meteorological Fergus

Law and order in Kiribati 

Law of Kiribati
 Constitution of Kiribati
 Crime in Kiribati
 Human rights in Kiribati
 LGBT rights in Kiribati
 Freedom of religion in Kiribati
 Law enforcement in Kiribati

Military of Kiribati 

Military of Kiribati
There is no military in Kiribati.

Local government in Kiribati 

Local government in Kiribati

History of Kiribati 

History of Kiribati
Timeline of the history of Kiribati
Current events of Kiribati
 Military history of Kiribati

Culture of Kiribati 

Culture of Kiribati
 Architecture of Kiribati
 Cuisine of Kiribati
 Dance in Kiribati
 Festivals in Kiribati
 Languages of Kiribati
 Media in Kiribati
 National symbols of Kiribati
 Coat of arms of Kiribati
 Flag of Kiribati
 National anthem of Kiribati
 People of Kiribati
 Public holidays in Kiribati
 Records of Kiribati
 Religion in Kiribati
 Christianity in Kiribati
 Hinduism in Kiribati
 Islam in Kiribati
 Judaism in Kiribati
 Sikhism in Kiribati
 World Heritage Sites in Kiribati:
 Phoenix Islands Protected Area

Art in Kiribati 
 Art in Kiribati
 Cinema of Kiribati
 Dance in Kiribati
 Literature of Kiribati
 Music of Kiribati
 Television in Kiribati
 Theatre in Kiribati

Sports in Kiribati 

Sports in Kiribati
 Football in Kiribati
 Kiribati at the Olympics

Economy and infrastructure of Kiribati 

Economy of Kiribati
 Economic rank, by nominal GDP (2007): 189th (one hundred and eighty ninth)
 Agriculture in Kiribati
 Banking in Kiribati
 National Bank of Kiribati
 Communications in Kiribati
 Internet in Kiribati
 Companies of Kiribati
Currency of Kiribati: Dollar
ISO 4217: AUD
 Energy in Kiribati
 Energy policy of Kiribati
 Oil industry in Kiribati
 Mining in Kiribati
 Tourism in Kiribati
 Transport in Kiribati
 Kiribati Stock Exchange

Education in Kiribati 

Education in Kiribati

Infrastructure of Kiribati
 Health care in Kiribati
 Transportation in Kiribati
 Airports in Kiribati
 Rail transport in Kiribati
 Roads in Kiribati

See also 

Gilbertese language
Index of Kiribati-related articles
List of international rankings
List of Kiribati-related topics
Member state of the Commonwealth of Nations
Member state of the United Nations
Outline of geography
Outline of Oceania

References

External links 

 Parliament of Kiribati
 Encyclopædia Britannica, Kiribati
 Phoenix Islands Protected Area 
 

Kiribati